Cathleen Mae Webb (also known as Cathleen Crowell Webb)  was an Illinois woman, who, in 1985, recanted her testimony from an earlier rape case to free an innocent man. The convicted man, Gary Dotson, was released and later exonerated in the first celebrated case involving DNA evidence.

Allegation 
In 1977, Webb, then known as Cathleen Crowell, was a 16-year-old resident of Homewood, Illinois, living with her foster parents. On July 9, on her way home from her part-time job at a Long John Silver's fast food restaurant, she claimed to have been abducted by three men in a car, one of whom raped her. Later, after contacting police, she identified a suspect from a composite sketch and a mug shot. Gary Dotson was soon arrested as a suspect after matching her description. In a 1979 trial, her testimony, along with scientific evidence by a forensic serology expert (later found to have fraudulent credentials), was used to convict Dotson, who was then sentenced to a 25-to 50-year prison term for kidnapping and rape.

Recantation 
In 1985, Webb was married and living in Jaffrey, New Hampshire. She became active in the Baptist church. After confessing to her pastor, she decided to come forward with the truth. Securing a lawyer, she contacted the Cook County State Attorney's office. In her testimony, she admitted to fabricating the charges in 1977 to cover up a possible pregnancy after having consensual sex with her boyfriend. She claimed to have panicked at the thought of being thrown out of her foster parents' house.

Webb's recantation was dismissed at first by state prosecutors and the Cook County District Attorney's office. When her lawyer, John McLario, contacted the Chicago Tribune and WLS-TV the news media focused on the story and there was intense local interest, with sympathy solidly on Webb and Dotson's side. In a hearing held at the Markham Branch Court on April 4, Dotson was released on bond. At a hearing on April 11, however, Judge Richard L. Samuels, faced with confusing evidence, revoked the bond and ordered Dotson back to prison. McLario and Webb then took their case to the national media. News editors found Webb a photogenic subject, and she attracted nationwide attention after a cover story on the April 21 edition of People magazine. The media frenzy drew in  Illinois Governor James R. Thompson. Unable to ignore the publicity and apparent political pressure, Thompson personally presided over clemency hearings on May 10. The hearings were televised live at the State of Illinois Center in Chicago. After three days Thompson commuted Dotson's sentence.

Following the hearings, Webb and Dotson made appearances together on national television, including the CBS Morning News. This led to the suggestion by co-host Phyllis George that the two embrace, outraging critics and audience alike. Later in 1985, Webb co-authored the book Forgive Me (written with Marie Chapian). In the book, Webb chronicled an extraordinarily troubled childhood. Her mother had suffered from mental illness and was institutionalized. Her father abandoned Webb to the custody of an elderly acquaintance who could not care for her properly. Denied family connection and affection, Webb said she became sexually active at the age of 12. Later, Webb detailed her involvement and interest in the Pilgrim Baptist Church in New Hampshire as well as the bible study that led to her atonement.

Resolution 
Cathleen Crowell Webb returned to New Hampshire and avoided interviews and media exposure. Dotson, meanwhile, had not been cleared of the original rape charges. He had a troubled release from prison, including several parole violations. Webb sent him the advance she received from a book publisher  (reportedly  $17,500). Finally in 1988, a new type of DNA testing, known as the PCR technique, became available. This form of testing was accurate on degraded samples (taken from Webb in 1977) and proved that no contact between the two had taken place.  Webb raised four children before dying of breast cancer on May 15, 2008, just a month before her 47th birthday.

References

Bibliography
 Webb, Cathleen Crowell, Forgive Me,

External links
 
 

1961 births
2008 deaths
Deaths from breast cancer
People from Cook County, Illinois
People from New Hampshire